Tuhaň is a municipality and village in Česká Lípa District in the Liberec Region of the Czech Republic. It has about 300 inhabitants.

Administrative parts
Villages and hamlets of Dolní Dubová Hora, Domašice, Obrok, Pavličky and Tuhanec are administrative parts of Tuhaň.

References

Villages in Česká Lípa District